Pingdi Yi Ethnic Township is an ethnic township in Panzhou, Guizhou, China.

Administrative division
As of December 2015, the ethnic township is divided into 15 villages: 
 Wangjiajing
 Yingshang
 Yuge
 Fachong
 Jingkou 
 Moxili
 Xiaoshulin
 Jiangdi
 Baobaozhai
 Geqingdi
 Chahe
 Baimuga
 Qiguanyun
 Shakemei
 Shangshuge

Geography

Economy
The ethnic township's main industries are agriculture, mining and tourism. Maize, potato and buckwheat are the main cash crops. Iron, copper and limestone are the main minerals.

Transport
The Provincial Highway S212 passes across the town north to south.

Attractions
The Wumeng Prairie Scenic Area is a national geological park and provincial scenic area in the ethnic township.

References

Divisions of Panzhou
Yi ethnic townships